Uzhaikkum Karangal is a 1976 Indian Tamil-language film directed by K. Shankar, starring M. G. Ramachandran Latha and Bhavani. It was released on 23 May 1976.

Plot 

Rangan is a poor man who finds employment in the house of Akkilandham. He works hard and finds love in Muthamma after some initial tiff. Gowri, widowed daughter of Akkilandam propositions him but he turns down accepting her as a sister. She however falls in the trap of Kabali who masquerades as a godman. He drugs, seduces and impregnates her before running off. The blame falls on Rangan, whom no one believes except Muthamma. Rangan traces and finds Kabali, makes him confess and marries him off to Gowri thereby clearing his name.

Cast 
M. G. Ramachandran as Rangan
Latha as Muthamma
Bhavani as Kumari Pankajam
Kumari Padmini as Gowri
Pandari Bai as Annam
C. K. Saraswathi as Akkilandham
Baby Rajkumari as Ramu
K. A. Thangavelu as Nagalingham
Thengai Srinivasan as Kabali
Nagesh as Saba / Kitha
K. Kannan as Karnaya
V. S. Raghavan as Sendhil Nadhan
V. Gopalakrishnan as Thanga Durai
Shanmugasundaram as Public prosector
Karikol Raju as Kumaresan
Usilai Mani as Iyer
Idichapuli Selvaraj as Fake saint
Peeli Sivam as Drunker
T. K. S. Natarajan as Villager
Sathya as Villager

Soundtrack 
The music was composed by M. S. Viswanathan.

Reception 
Kanthan of Kalki wrote for people who do not expect and care about unique plot, character development and who enjoy the entertaining features of scenic views, catchy dialogues and catchy songs will definitely not be disappointed when they watch Uzhaikkum Karangal.

References

External links 
 

1970s Tamil-language films
1976 films
Films directed by K. Shankar
Films scored by M. S. Viswanathan